Tour & Taxis is a large former industrial site in Brussels, Belgium.

The main buildings on the site are made of brick, glass and wrought iron, and are prime examples of 19th-century industrial architecture.

Though the site was long disused following its loss of importance as a shipping and customs hub, it has been partially restored, and is now used for large cultural events, which have included Couleur Café Festival, the Brussels Design Market, Art Brussels, The Color Run Belgium and Salon du Chocolat, as well as for office space.

History

Origins: Thurn und Taxis family

Over the long history of the swampy lands that originally constituted the site, certain parcels belonged to the Thurn und Taxis (or Tassis) German noble family. Philip the Fair of Burgundy promoted Frans Von Tassis to postmaster in 1504; a position Tassis also held for Maximilian I, Holy Roman Emperor, beginning in 1489. Francisco moved the family to Brussels by 1516, and from there they organised the first international postal service. The imperial postal service linked the wealthy Low Countries to the Spanish court, and served the Holy Roman Empire and the rest of Europe. The horse-based postal service would be based in Brussels for nearly two centuries before moving to Frankfurt, Germany, in 1704.

The fields in were used as pasture for the family's horses. The family gave their name to a small road that crossed through the area. This was rendered into French as Tour et Taxis, and would give its name to the area after its transition into a busy port.

Industrialisation

Along with much of the rest of Europe, Belgium experienced intense economic and industrial growth during the "long nineteenth century". The Willebroek Canal, which had originally been constructed in the 1550s and 1560s, took on increased importance in Belgium's global trade over the course of the 1800s, as it connects Brussels to the Scheldt River and ultimately the North Sea. In 1895, the Tour & Taxis site was selected by the Belgian State and the City of Brussels as the location for a new commercial station along the Brussels Canal.

Tour & Taxis was one of the first multi-modal freight transport platforms in the world. Frédéric Bruneel served as the main engineer for the project, while , Constant Bosmans and Henri Vandeveld worked as architects. Central to the site's functionality was the Maritime Station, a freight station constructed by Bruneel beginning in 1902 and open from 1907. The expansive  steel and glass structure was designed to efficiently receive goods by land, water and rail. Major sources of cargo included sugar, coffee, alcohol, tobacco, and chocolate. Customs and excise duties were then collected on-site via the Customs House, and goods were stored in bonded warehouses—the Public Depot and the Royal Depot—before their redistribution.

The buildings have been recognised for the quality of their construction. According to La Fonderie, Brussels Museum of Industry and Labour, the Tour & Taxis site is a "catalogue of architecture and civil engineering", as well as "a testament to the skills of Belgian engineers and workers, and their mastery of steel, iron, stone, glass and concrete." Their appearance was influenced by both the Flemish Renaissance and the Art Nouveau style characteristic of early 20th-century Brussels.

Growth and decline

During the first half of the 20th century, the busy Tour & Taxis site furthered industrial and economic development in Brussels. According to La Fonderie, "construction of the complex and the port resulted in the development of the surrounding area, where life soon revolved around the packaging, storage, sale and transportation of different cargoes... Outstanding industrial buildings sprang up, followed by residential buildings and workers' housing estates. The Tour & Taxis complex was a hive of social and economic activity. In its heyday at the end of the 1960s, it employed a workforce of almost 3,000."

As Europe's economic landscape shifted over the latter half of the 20th century, so did Tour & Taxis' importance as a centre of commerce and industry. The Treaty of Rome in 1957, of which Belgium was a signing member, created the European Economic Community (EEC) and initiated Europe's move away from economic borders and towards a single market via reduced customs duties and the establishment of a customs union. At the same time, Belgium's expansion of its roads and highways in the 1960s and 1970s (see Transport in Belgium) facilitated the increased transport of goods by road versus waterways or railways. The free movement of capital and goods within the EEC (and, from 1993, the European Union), combined with the changing means by which those goods were distributed within member states, gradually made the original function of the buildings at Tour & Taxis irrelevant. The Public Depot and the Royal Depot were rented out to private companies for storage space, but building maintenance became too expensive for the railway and port companies to maintain. By the 1990s, the Port of Brussels and the National Railway Company of Belgium (NMBS/SNCB) each put their shares of the Tour & Taxis property up for sale.

Redevelopment
What Tour & Taxis would become in its next iteration remained unclear for several years. Plans to develop a 12,000-person concert hall on the premises were met with opposition by organisations like La Fonderie, The International Committee for the Conservation of the Industrial Heritage, the International Council on Monuments and Sites, World Monuments Watch and Europa Nostra.

Project T&T, a joint venture among three real estate development companies—Extensa (Ackermans & van Haaren), RB Management, and IRET development—purchased the site in 2001. Extensa bought out the other partners in 2014. Each of the historical buildings has been renovated or is in the process of being renovated as part of a mixed-use development with office space, residences, a public park, public services, shopping and restaurants, while preserving the architectural heritage of the site.

Heritage buildings

The Royal Depot was the first to be redeveloped. The original train track running through the bonded warehouse was replaced with an inner walkway lined by shops, restaurants such as Le Pain Quotidien, bars, a spa, and a childcare centre. The former storerooms on the upper floors were converted to office space and are occupied by law offices, creative and communications agencies, insurance companies, the public sector, and the like.

The former Public Depot (renamed the "Sheds"), once used to store incoming goods, was redeveloped next and is now one of the largest events venues in Brussels.

The former Hôtel de la Poste administrative building is now used for meetings and events such as the International Interior Design Exhibition Brussels. The former Hôtel des Douanes customs building is utilised as temporary office space, and is currently occupied by the Belgian branch of French public relations firm Publicis Groupe.

Extensa is currently redeveloping the Maritime Station, and announced plans to reopen the  freight station in 2020 as a year-round "covered neighbourhood" with workspaces, a food hall, gardens and events space. The renovated station will use geothermal energy along with repurposed paving stones and wood from the original building. It will use electrochromic technology for its intelligent glass window glazing, which uses electric pulses to adjust the opacity of each window, with the option of creating either a dimmed or one-way mirror effect. Standalone workspaces made from wooden modules are anticipated to accommodate 2,000 people within the station.

In 2008, Tour & Taxis was named a winner of the European Heritage Europa Nostra Awards in recognition of the conservation and redevelopment of its heritage buildings.

New developments

Two new office buildings have been developed at Tour & Taxis. When it opened in 2015, the Brussels Environment building was the largest passive office building in Belgium. The building was rated and certified as "excellent" by BREEAM in recognition of its sustainability. The , open in 2017, and currently housing the administration of the Flemish Government, is now the country's largest passive office building. Neutelings Riedijk Architects designed the building using recycled materials, geothermic heating, rainwater recycling, and solar powered electricity. The Herman Teirlinck building won an EU Mies Award in 2019.

The rail lines that once brought trains and their goods to the Maritime Station remained on the Tour & Taxis site decades after the closure of the freight station. Beginning in 2013, they were removed and replaced with a park which will total  when complete. According to former Brussels Minister of the Environment and Energy, Évelyne Huytebroek, it is the largest park to be developed in Brussels since the time of King Leopold II.

Residential apartments were added to Tour & Taxis in 2017, 31 of which were sold to the City of Brussels for use as subsidised housing. The site's current residential development project, known as Park Lane, is to be located near the Maritime Station and the park, and will feature an estimated 900 homes.

The City of Brussels began developing a pedestrian and cyclist bridge on the Brussels Canal connecting Brussels-North railway station and Tour & Taxis in autumn 2019. The bridge is to be named after , a pioneer in the Brussels LGBTIQ+ movement in the 20th century.

In 2018, Brussels announced plans to create new tram lines connecting Belgica metro station on the border of Jette and Molenbeek-Saint-Jean with Brussels-North railway station, and with the Place Charles Rogier/Karel Rogierplein in Saint-Josse-ten-Noode via Tour & Taxis.

Social engagement and urban industry
In 2018, Tour & Taxis invited the public to name new private and public streets on the redeveloped site. According to The Guardian, "Belgian citizens were given the chance to name 28 streets, alleys, squares and walkways that make up the former industrial zone of Tour & Taxis. The final names were chosen by a jury comprising city officials, local heritage experts and property developer Extensa." Ceci n'est pas une rue ("This is not a street") was one choice, a reference to the Belgian surrealist artist René Magritte's painting The Treachery of Images. Another street was named for the Belgian impressionist painter Anna Boch. The late Belgian filmmaker Chantal Akerman, known for the cult classic Jeanne Dielman, 23 quai du Commerce, 1080 Bruxelles, and Belgium's first female doctor, Isala Van Diest, each had a street named in their honour.

Also in 2018, an obelisk was erected in the Tour & Taxis park to commemorate the 70th anniversary of the signing of the Universal Declaration of Human Rights. The obelisk was commissioned by former Brussels Minister of the Environment and Energy, and designed by architect Bas Smelts.

PermaFungi, a circular economy project that sells oyster mushrooms at local businesses in Brussels,  grows its mushrooms in the basement of the Royal Depot from used coffee grounds collected from Le Pain Quotidien.

The non-profit organisation Parckfarm T&T operates on the grounds of the Tour & Taxis park. The volunteer-run "edible park" focuses on environmental and social projects, and offers classes on gardening, cooking, and nutrition.

Early in 2020, the new production site and taproom of the Brasserie de la Senne opened its doors at Tour & Taxis, on the /. The new brewery is directly across from the Royal Depot. It was located in Molenbeek-Saint-Jean before moving to its present site. The brewery is well known for many of its award-winning ales and stouts.

References

Footnotes

Notes

External links

 Official website

Neighbourhoods of Brussels
Buildings and structures in Brussels
Parks in Brussels
City of Brussels
Culture in Brussels
Thurn und Taxis